Middle Farmhouse is a historic farmhouse located at Cazenovia in Madison County, New York.  It was built about 1820 and is a two-story, gable-roofed frame residence in the Federal style.  Also on the property is a well.

It was added to the National Register of Historic Places in 1987.

References

Houses on the National Register of Historic Places in New York (state)
Federal architecture in New York (state)
Houses completed in 1820
Houses in Madison County, New York
National Register of Historic Places in Cazenovia, New York